Brownies are the section in the Girl Guides (or in the United States, Girl Scouts) organization for girls aged seven years old to ten years old. Exact age limits are slightly different in each organization.

History
Brownies, originally called Rosebuds, were first organized by Lord Baden-Powell in 1914, to complete the range of age groups for girls in Scouting. They were first run as the youngest group in the Guide Association by Agnes Baden-Powell, Lord Baden-Powell's younger sister. In 1918 his wife, Lady Olave Baden-Powell, took over the responsibility for the Girl Guides and thus for Brownies.

Originally the girls were called Rosebuds, but were renamed by Lord Baden-Powell after the girls had complained that they did not like their name. Their name comes from the story "The Brownies" by Juliana Horatia Ewing, written in 1870. In the story two children, Tommy and Betty, learn that children can be helpful brownies instead of being lazy boggarts.

In November 2022, the Girl Guides in Canada announced by January 2023 they would rename this section of Guides, as it was deemed to be "a barrier to racialized girls and women" and to be more inclusive. In January 2023, the name Brownies was changed to Embers.

Italian history
In Italy, the term was maintained and also extended to boys, coexisting with Wolf Cubs.

United Kingdom

In the United Kingdom, Brownies were originally called Rosebuds. Rosebuds was started in 1914 and was originally for girls aged 8–11. Rosebuds was renamed to Brownies in 1915. In 1937 Princess Margaret became the first royal Brownie.

Brownies is the second youngest section of Girlguiding in the UK, catering for girls aged 7–10. A group of Brownies who meet together is called a unit. Brownies work in small groups called sixes: each six is named after either fairies or woodland creatures. A six is led by a Sixer and has a Second who acts as deputy. The Brownie programme is called the Brownie Adventure. It is split into 3 parts:
you, community, world.

Brownies work towards interest badges,  there are 57. These can be done in meetings with the unit or at home or in clubs such as swimming. Brownies can also work towards their Adventure badges. These are gained over a period of time and require girls to complete many different activities, such as going on an adventure, taking part in an activity with another unit and earning an interest badge.

There are a few Brownie songs that some packs sing at the beginning of the meeting:

Come let us make a Brownie ring, a Brownie Ring a Brownie Ring
Come let us make a Brownie Ring, we hear our Brown Owl Calling.

Under the Brownie bridge we go, bridge we go, bridge we go
Under the Brownie bridge we go, because we are the..... (name of six is entered)

This is usually sung as each six skips under the brownie bridge and into the circle. It is often followed by the next song:

We're Brownie Guides, we're Brownie Guides
We're here to lend a hand
To love our God and serve our Queen
And to help our homes and land
We're Brownie friends, we're Brownie friends
In North, South, East and West
We're joined together in our wish
To try to do our best

There are slight variations of the songs.

Some packs also sing one of the traditional songs to end a meeting, to the tune of the Cambridge Chimes:

O Lord, our God
Thy children call
Grant us Thy peace
And bless us all

O Lord, this week
Thy children seek
Good deeds to do
And to be true
Good-night (everyone then salutes each other)

The UK headquarters of guides and brownies is on Buckingham Palace Road in London.

Motto, Promise and Law

Australia
In Australia (where girls of all ages are now called Girl Guides) the Guiding Promise is:

I promise that I will do my best,
To be true to myself and develop my beliefs,
To serve my community and Australia,
and live by the Guide law.

Prior to 2012, the Promise was:

I promise that I will do my best;
To do my duty to God,
To serve the Queen and my country
To help other people
and keep the Guide law.

The Brownie Guide Law, prior to 1996, was:
A Brownie Guide thinks of others before herself and should do a good turn everyday.

The Brownie Promise  1990: I promise to do my best, to do my duty to God, to serve my Queen & my country, to help other people and to do a good deed every day.

Motto 1990: Be prepared.

The Brownie Guide Motto, prior to 1996, was:
Lend a hand

The Guide Law, Promise and Motto, which are followed by all ages of the guiding movement after 1996, are the Laws, Promise and Motto relating to the guide age group.

Canada

In Girl Guides of Canada, the Brownie Promise is:
I promise to do my best,
To be true to myself, my beliefs and Canada,
I will take action for a better world,
And respect the Brownie Law.

The Canadian Brownie Law is:
As a Brownie I am honest and kind. I help take care of the world around me.

The Canadian Brownie Motto is:
Lend a Hand
Old Promise:

The old Brownie Promise is from the 1950s
I promise to do my best,
To do my duty to God and the Queen [or "to God, the Queen, and my country"]
To help other people every day, especially those at home.

The English Brownie 
Law is:
A brownie guide thinks of others before herself and does a good turn every day.

The English Brownie Motto is:
"Lend A Hand" (LAH)

On 2023, the term Brownies was changed to Embers over concerns the name was racist.

Hong Kong
In Hong Kong, the Brownie Promise is:

I will promise to do my best,
To be true to myself,
To my God, and my country, and the country in which I live,
To help others and to keep the Brownie Guide Law.

The Law is:
As a Brownie Guide,
I will care for my home, my community and myself.
I will do a good turn every day.

Ireland
In Ireland, the Brownie Promise is:

I promise to do my best,
To do my duty to my God and my country,
To help those at home everyday,
And to obey the Brownie Guide Law.

The word 'God' can be replaced by the word 'faith' according to one's spiritual beliefs.

The Irish Brownie Motto is:
Lend a Hand

Singapore
The Singaporean Brownie Promise is:I promise to do my best, to do my duty to God, to serve my country, and help other people, and to keep the Brownie Law.The Singaporean Brownie Law is:
A brownie obeys and respect her elders.
A brownie thinks of others before herself.
A brownie tells the truth.
A brownie is neat and tidy.
A brownie is thrifty.
A brownie plays and works cheerfully.

The Singaporean Brownie Motto is:Lend a hand

United Kingdom

In the United Kingdom, the Brownie Promise is:
I promise that I will do my best:
To be true to myself and develop my beliefs,
To serve the King and my community,
To help other people
and
To keep the Brownie Guide Law.

After a wide public consultation in spring 2013, the promise wording was changed for all sections.

The Brownie promise before September 2013 was:
I promise that I will do my best:
To love my God,
To serve The Queen and my country
To help other people,
And to keep the Brownie Guide Law.

The Brownie Guide Law is:
A Brownie Guide thinks of others before herself and does a good turn every day.

The Brownie Guide Motto used to be 'Lend a hand' (LAH). With the introduction of the new programme in the United Kingdom, the motto was dropped for Brownies.

United States

In the United States, Brownies use the same Promise and Law as the other age groups of the Girl Scouts of the USA.

Girl Scout Promise:
On my honor, I will try:
To serve God and my country,
To help people at all times,
And to live by the Girl Scout Law.

Girl Scout Law:
I will do my best to be
honest and fair,
friendly and helpful,
considerate and caring,
courageous and strong, and
responsible for what I say and do,
and to
respect myself and others,
respect authority,
use resources wisely,
make the world a better place, and
be a sister to every Girl Scout.

References

External links

 Girlguiding UK
 The Brownies And Other Tales by Juliana Horatia Ewing, 1870, from Project Gutenberg

Girl Guiding and Girl Scouting